Léon Solomiac (19 October 1873 in Cajarc – 10 May 1960 in Cannes) was a colonial administrator in various colonies of the French Colonial Empire.

Life
Solomiac was a son of a shopkeeper. In the course of his career in the French colonial service, he was appointed in July 1925 as a delegate in Beirut then in 1930 in Damascus, during the French Mandate for Syria and the Lebanon. After the deposition of Taj al-Din al-Hasani, Solomiac officiated on 19 November 1931 as head of state of the Syrian Republic until 11 June 1932, when Mohammed Ali al-Abed was elected by the Syrian Parliament to the presidency.

Later on, Solomiac went to Africa in which he became the governor of French Sudan from 22 May to 30 November 1933 on an interim basis. On 15 August 1934 he became the successor of François Adrien Juvanon as a governor of French India, he held this position until October 1936. On 21 April 1939 he became the Governor-General of French Equatorial Africa, he remained in office until 3 September 1939. On 7 November 1940 Solomiac took over from Jean Alexandre Léon Rapenne the interim post of Governor of Niger. However, he was deposed by the Vichy regime as being not loyal to them, and was replaced on 8 December 1940 by General Maurice Falvy. In August 1944, Léon Solomiac was entrusted with the management of official duties of the prefecture of Tarn. He was the "Prefect of the Libération", replacing a prefect appointed by the Vichy regime in July 1944, and was in office until early 1946.

References

1873 births
1960 deaths
Colonial Governors of French Mali
Colonial Governors of French Niger
French colonial governors and administrators
Governors of French Equatorial Africa
Governors of French India
People of French West Africa